R. Neelakantan (20 July 1936 – 10 May 2018), best known by his stage name Neelu, was an Indian actor known for his comedy and supporting role performances in Tamil cinema, television and theatre. He has acted in over 7,000 plays and 160 films. He died on 10 May 2018 in Chennai.

Career 
Neelu started acting in school plays from school days, continuing through his college days at Vivekananda College. He along with Ambi (Cho Ramaswamy's brother) and Narayanasamy started Viveka Fine Arts. He acted in plays like Muhammad bin Tughluq, Endru Thaniyum Indha Sudandira Dhaagam, Quo Vadis, Unmayae Un Vilai Enna?, Yarukkum Vetkamillai. In 1966 he made his film debut Aayiram Poi directed by Muktha Srinivasan. He has acted in plays along with Crazy Mohan, Cho Ramaswamy. He has also worked as production manager in Jerry. All through his career, he worked with V D Swamy before retiring from his day job after 40 years of service.

Filmography 
This is partial filmography. You can expand it.

Television 
 Engey Brahmanan
 Vidathu Sirippu (2003)
 Siri Siri Crazy ( ' Madhu balaji Father ' )
 Washingtonil Tirumanam (groom's father) (1995)

References 

1936 births
2018 deaths
Male actors in Tamil cinema
Actors in Tamil theatre
Indian male film actors
University of Madras alumni
Male actors from Chennai
Tamil comedians
Indian male comedians